Charles-François-Antoine, marquis de Lambertie (22 October 1708, Lunéville – 9 February 1777, Cons-la-Grandville) was a French aristocrat of the Ancien régime.

Career
Lambertie served as an officer in the Royal Regiment of Guards becoming Lieutenant-Colonel, as well as serving King Louis XV as a diplomatic envoy to London.

He was appointed a Knight of the Order of the Holy Spirit and of the Sovereign Military Order of Malta.

Family
He succeeded his father, who had been created a Marquis in 1719 (Nicolas-François, a Lieutenant-General of the French Army) in the family titles, including Count de Cons-la-Grandville, Baron de Bioncourt, Seigneur de Chenières, de Villers-la-Chèvre, de Cônes, Flaubeville, de Cutry, du Grand et Petit-Failly, etc.

The Marquis of Lambertie married three times:
1. (1736) Marie-Anne-Françoise-Xavière de Custine (died 1739, in childbirth), daughter and sole heiress of Charles-Ferdinand, comte de Wiltz.
2. (1758) Dame Antoinette de Vaux.
3. (1771) Marie-Françoise Louvain de Fontaines.

See also
 List of Ambassadors of France to the United Kingdom

References

External links
 Château de Lambertie
 Dictionnaire génealogique, héraldique et chronologique: Famille Lambertye (Paris 1757)

1708 births
1777 deaths
People from Moselle (department)
French noble families
French marquesses
18th-century French diplomats
Knights of Malta
Ambassadors of France to Great Britain
Vaux family